List of military aircraft of Norway consists of the aircraft of Royal Norwegian Air Force, established in 1944 with the amalgamation of the Royal Norwegian Navy Air Service and the Norwegian Army Air Service, both of which were established in 1912.

Below is a list of aircraft used by the Norwegian Air Forces throughout their history. The majority of aircraft before 1940 were built in  Norway while the majority of aircraft used after 1940 were built either in the United Kingdom or the United States.

Aircraft used by the Air Force and its predecessors

References

Norske militærfly 1912-1940. (Arnesen, Odd. 2003)
Hærens og marinens flyvåpen 1912-1945. (Meyer, Fredrik. 1973)
Fra Spitfire til F-16 - Luftforsvaret 50 år 1944-1994 (Arheim, Hafsten, Olsen, Thuve. 1994)
Oppdrag utført - Norges luftmilitære kulturarv (Glenne, Roar. 2012)

Norway
Aircraft
Aircraft